Jan H. Kemp (March 13, 1949 – December 4, 2008) was an American academic and English tutor who exposed the bias in passing college football players and filed a lawsuit against the University of Georgia.

Born in Griffin, Georgia, Kemp earned a bachelor's degree in journalism and a doctorate in English education from the University of Georgia.  She began teaching at her alma mater in the developmental program in September 1976.  In 1981 Kemp was one of the teachers who complained claiming that Georgia officials had intervened allowing nine college football players to pass a remedial English course, allowing them to play against Notre Dame in the Sugar Bowl for the national championship in 1981.

Kemp was demoted in 1982 and dismissed one year later.  She then filed a lawsuit claiming she had been fired due to her complaints about the passing of players.  During the time after she was dismissed Kemp tried to commit suicide twice.  The University defended its actions saying that Kemp was dismissed for "disruptive conduct and for failure to conduct adequate scholarly research."

The jury found the University liable for the illegal dismissal of Kemp and she was awarded $2.5 million, which was later reduced to $1.08 million.  Kemp was reinstated and University President Fred C. Davison resigned.  After the trial Kemp spoke to The New York Times, saying, "All over the country, athletes are used to produce revenue.  I've seen what happens when the lights dim and the crowd fades.  They're left with nothing.  I want that stopped."  Kemp retired from teaching in 1990 and was named a hero of the 1980s by People magazine.

Kemp died on December 4, 2008, at the age of 59.  Her son stated that she had died from complications of Alzheimer's disease.  She is survived by her son and daughter.

References

1949 births
2008 deaths
University of Georgia faculty
People from Griffin, Georgia
Neurological disease deaths in Georgia (U.S. state)
Deaths from Alzheimer's disease
American whistleblowers